= Memory typewriter =

Typewriter with memory

A memory typewriter is a typewriter that can hold a limited amount of memory, allowing for text and documents to be retained. Memory typewriters helped reduce the amount of time needed for lawyers to revise documents.

Memory typewriters were first introduced in the 1940s to create legal agreements with large amounts of repetitive text. Memory typewriters peaked in popularity during the 1970s and are now considered obsolete. However, there are still a small number of manufacturers that produce them.
